W24 may refer to:

LSWR O2 Class W24 Calbourne, an example of the Adams LSWR O2 Class 0-4-4T, which is based at the Isle of Wight Steam Railway
Mercedes-Benz W24 or Mercedes-Benz 540K (type W24), a car fabricated by the German firm Mercedes-Benz from 1935 to 1940
Wanderer W24, middle market car introduced by Auto Union under the Wanderer brand in 1937
The Steiner system S(5,8,24), also called the Witt design W24.
W24 (band), a South Korean band
, a regional television broadcaster in Austria